Chromone (or 1,4-benzopyrone) is a derivative of benzopyran with a substituted keto group on the pyran ring. It is an isomer of coumarin.

Derivatives of chromone are collectively known as chromones.  Most, though not all, chromones are also phenylpropanoids.

Examples 
 6,7-dimethoxy-2,3-dihydrochromone has been isolated from Sarcolobus globosus.
 Eucryphin, a chromone rhamnoside, can be isolated from the bark of Eucryphia cordifolia.
 Cromolyn (disodium cromoglicate) was found to inhibit antigen challenge as well as stress induced symptoms.  Cromoglicate is used as a mast cell stabilizer in allergic rhinitis, asthma and allergic conjunctivitis.
 Nedocromil sodium was found to have a somewhat longer half-life than cromolyn; however, production was discontinued in the US in 2008.
 Xanthone with a second aromatic ring.

See also
 Coumarin – a structural isomer
 Furanochromones

References

External links
 – "4-chromone"

Synthesis at organic-chemistry.org